Alloschemone inopinata is a species of flowering plant in the genus Alloschemone of the arum family Araceae.

It was once included in Scindapsus, but was re-classified info Alloschemone.

Distribution 
Its native range is N. Brazil (Amazonas).

References 

Monsteroideae